The Lord of Steel Live is the heavy metal band Manowar's first live EP. It was recorded between 2012 and 2013 during both legs of The Lord of Steel tour with every track recorded in a different country. Live versions of six songs are included, five of them from The Lord of Steel (2012) and one from their previous EP Thunder in the Sky (2009).

Prior to release Manowar announced the complete track list and some other details about the upcoming record through the media. The EP was released in the aftermath of The Lord of Steel tour in 2013 first as a download on iTunes Store, with a physical copy release following.

Reception

The EP's reception was mixed - unfavourable opinions cited the song material itself as a big problem, and disappointment was also expressed towards the production. Positive feedback pointed out that Manowar still performs strong in a live setting.

Track listing

Personnel
Eric Adams – vocals
Karl Logan – guitars
Joey DeMaio – bass
Donnie Hamzik – drums, percussion

Studio production
Derk Kloiber - mixing and mastering
Joey DeMaio - production, mixing, mastering

References

Manowar albums
2013 EPs